This was the first edition of the tournament.

Andre Begemann and Daniel Masur won the title after defeating Guillermo García López and David Vega Hernández 7–6(7–2), 6–4 in the final.

Seeds

Draw

References

External links
 Main draw

Maia Challenger - Doubles